This is a list of wars involving the Kingdom of England before the creation of the Kingdom of Great Britain by the Acts of Union 1707. For dates after 1708, see List of wars involving the United Kingdom.

10th and 11th centuries

12th century

13th century

14th century

15th century

16th century

17th century

18th century

List of civil wars
 Rebellion of 1088 – in England and Normandy
 The Anarchy (1135–54) – in England
 Revolt of 1173–74 – in England, Normandy, and Anjou
 First Barons' War (1215–17) – in England
 Second Barons' War (1264–67) – in England
 Welsh Uprising (1282) – in England and Wales
 Peasants' Revolt (1381) – in England
 Wars of the Roses (1455–1485) – in England and Wales; Richard III was the last English king to die in combat
 Cornish Rebellion of 1497 - in England
 Wars of the Three Kingdoms (1639–1651) – in England, Wales, Scotland and Ireland
 First Bishops' War (1639)
 Second Bishops' War (1640)
 Irish Rebellion of 1641
 First English Civil War (1642–46)
 The Confederates' War (1642–48)
 Scotland in the Wars of the Three Kingdoms (1644–47)
 Second English Civil War (1648)
 Third English Civil War (1650–51)
 Cromwellian conquest of Ireland (1649)
 Monmouth Rebellion (1685) – in England
 Jacobite Rebellions (1689–91; 1715–16; 1719; 1745–46) – in England, Scotland and Ireland
 Williamite War in Ireland (1688–91)
 Battle of the Boyne (1690) – last battle between two rival claimants for the throne

See also
 List of English civil wars
 List of wars in Great Britain
 Military history of England
 List of wars involving England and France
 List of wars involving the United Kingdom

References

Further reading
 Barnett, Correlli. Britain and her army, 1509-1970: a military, political and social survey (1970).
 Carlton, Charles. This Seat of Mars: War and the British Isles, 1485-1746 (Yale UP; 2011) 332 pages; studies the impact of near unceasing war from the individual to the national levels.
 Chandler, David G., and Ian Frederick William Beckett, eds. The Oxford history of the British army (Oxford UP, 2003).
 Cole, D. H and E. C Priestley. An outline of British military history, 1660-1936 (1936). online
 Higham, John, ed. A Guide to the Sources of British Military History  (1971) 654 pages excerpt; Highly detailed bibliography and discussion up to 1970.
 Sheppard, Eric William. A short history of the British army (1950). online

Historiography
 Messenger, Charles, ed. Reader's Guide to Military History (2001) pp 55–74; annotated guide to most important books.

 
England
Wars

Wars
Wars England